Nagoya Airport may refer to one of two airports serving in Nagoya, Japan:

 Chūbu Centrair International Airport, also known as Chūbu Airport
 Nagoya Airfield, formerly known as Nagoya Airport, also known as Komaki Airport

pt:Aeroporto de Nagoya